Bernarda Pera and Kateřina Siniaková defeated Mayar Sherif and Tereza Martincová in the final, 6–2, 6–7(7–9), [10–5], to win the doubles tennis title at the 2022 Melbourne Summer Set 2. The win earned Pera her first career WTA title. 

This was the first edition of the tournament.

Seeds

Draw

Draw

See also
 2022 Melbourne Summer Set 1 – Women's doubles

References

External links
Main draw

Melbourne Summer Set 2 - Doubles